"Brachybacterium massiliense" is a species of Gram positive bacterium. It was first isolated from a stool sample of 38-month-old healthy girl from Senegal. The species was first proposed in 2017, and the name is derived from Massilia, the Roman name for Marseille, the location of the laboratory where B. massiliense was first isolated.

References

Micrococcales
Bacteria described in 2017